Leslie Gaye Griffin (March 6, 1935 – July 14, 2016), better known as Lisa Gaye, was an American actress, and dancer.

Early years
Gaye was born in Denver, Colorado to Frank Henry Griffin, a painter, and Margaret Allen Griffin (née Gibson), an actress.

The Griffin family moved from Denver to Los Angeles, California, in the 1930s to be close to the developing film industry. Her mother was determined that Gaye and her siblings make their careers in show business. Her siblings, Marcia (Teala Loring), Debralee (Debra Paget), and Frank (Ruell Shayne), all entered the business as either cast or crew.

She attended Hollywood's Professional School.

Career
Gaye made her first professional film appearance at the age of 7. At 17, she signed a seven-year contract with Universal Studios and was enrolled in the studio's professional school for actors and actresses.

She began her acting career with two uncredited cameos in 1953–54. Her first starring role was in Drums Across the River (1954). She appeared in 13 films between 1954 and 1967, including Ten Thousand Bedrooms (1957), Hawaiian Eye (1959) and How to Marry a Millionaire (1957).

On stage, Gaye acted in a production of Merry Wives of Windsor when she was 12 years old. In 1957, she made her stage adult debut in Darling, I'm Yours in San Francisco.

Television
Among Gaye's television appearances were three episodes of The George Burns and Gracie Allen Show in 1956, 13 episodes of The Bob Cummings Show as Colette Dubois, five episodes each of the ABC/Warner Brothers detective series, Hawaiian Eye and 77 Sunset Strip, two episodes of another ABC-WB series, Bourbon Street Beat, seven episodes of CBS's Perry Mason, and eleven episodes of the syndicated anthology series, Death Valley Days, along with several episodes of Sea Hunt and an episode of Colt .45.

She appears in one episode of Zorro in the 1957 season (Episode 13, Constance). She appeared twice in Have Gun - Will Travel in 1957 as Helen in "Helen of Abajinian", and as Nancy in "Gun Shy" (along with Dan Blocker, Corey Allen and Jeanette Nolan), and in the Science Fiction Theatre episode "Gravity Zero" as Elisabeth. She made a single appearance in the 1959 episode "The Peace Offering" of the syndicated western series, Pony Express, starring Grant Sullivan. Among her seven appearances on Perry Mason, Gaye played Rita Magovern who Mason exposed as the murderer of her husband Karl in the 1961 episode, "The Case of the Traveling Treasure." In 1964 she played as murderer Pamela Blair in "The Case of the Nautical Knot". Also in 1961, Gaye appeared as a Spanish woman tied up in a revolution against the United States in an episode of the Maverick TV Series titled State of Siege. She also appeared in several episodes of the Bat Masterson TV series. In two 1959 episodes; in "Sharpshooter", she played Laurie LaRue, the stage assistant and wife of stage sharpshooter, Danny Dowling. She also appeared in the 1959 episode "Buffalo Kill" as Susan. In the 1961 episode of Bat Masterson, "The Fatal Garment", she portrayed Elena, a Mexican Cantina owner.

Personal life
Gaye was married in 1955 to Bently C. Ware; the marriage ended with his death in 1977; the couple had one daughter, Janelle. She died in Houston, Texas, on July 14, 2016.

Selected filmography
 The Glenn Miller Story (1954) - Bobbysoxer (uncredited)
 Yankee Pasha (1954) - Harem Girl (uncredited)
 Drums Across the River (1954) - Jennie
 Magnificent Obsession (1954) - Switchboard Girl (uncredited)
 Ain't Misbehavin' (1955) - Chorine (uncredited)
 Rock Around the Clock (1956) - Lisa Johns
 Shake, Rattle & Rock! (1956) - June Fitzdingle
 Ten Thousand Bedrooms (1957) - Ana Martelli
 Sweethearts (1957)
 Night of Evil (1962) - Dixie Ann Dikes
 La cara del terror (1962) - Norma Borden
 Castle of Evil (1966) - Carrol Harris
 The Violent Ones (1967) - Dolores

Other television credits
 Annie Oakley (1956) - Vera Barker
 The George Burns and Gracie Allen Show (1956) - Carol Rogers / Felicia Norris / Mary Brewster
 The Adventures of Jim Bowie (1956-1957) - Maria Miro / Jeanne Brasseaur
 Have Gun – Will Travel (1957-1958) - Nancy Warren / Helen Abajinian
 The Walter Winchell File (1958) - Doris Carter
 Tombstone Territory (1958-1959) - Nancy Cooley / Miss Lizette
 How to Marry a Millionaire (1958-1959) - Gwen Kirby
 Perry Mason (1958-1966) - Laraine Keely / Pamela Blair / Joyce Hadley / Alyssa Laban / Rita Magovern / Lola Bronson / Juror
 Sea Hunt (1959) - Ann Barry / June Leeds / Philana / Louise Wiley / Blaze Green
 Bat Masterson (1959-1961) - Elena / Susan Carver / Lori Dowling / Lori La Rue
 Men Into Space (1960) - Joyce Lynn
 Wanted: Dead or Alive (1960) - Susan Marno
 Cheyenne (1960) - Francie Scott / Jenny Beaumont
 Rawhide (1960) - Odette Laurier
 Death Valley Days (1960-1969) - Lisa Tracy / Lottie Deno / Mystic Maude / Rosie Winters / Gypsy / Faith Turner / Lena / Tacilia - Healing Woman / Delores / Raquel / Yvonne Benet
 77 Sunset Strip, The Desert Spa Caper (09/29/1961) - Janet Hubbell
 Maverick (1961) - Soledad Lozaro
 Wagon Train (1961) - Alma Mendez
 Tales of Wells Fargo (1961) - Sunset / Michelle Bovarde
 Laramie (1962) - Winona
 The Wild Wild West (1966-1967) - Lana Benson / Lorelei
 The Time Tunnel (1967) - Ahza
 Get Smart (1967) - Miss Smith
 I Dream of Jeannie (1968) - Daisy Lou
 The Flying Nun (1969) - Rosita / Elena
 The Mod Squad (1970) - Yolanda (final appearance)

References

External links
 
 The Private Life and Times of Lisa Gaye
 Biography

1935 births
2016 deaths
Actresses from Los Angeles
Actresses from Denver
American female dancers
American dancers
American film actresses
American television actresses
People from Greater Los Angeles
20th-century American actresses
American stage actresses
Western (genre) film actresses
21st-century American women